Núria Marquès Soto (born 4 May 1999) is a Spanish Paralympic swimmer who competes in international level events.

References

1999 births
Living people
Paralympic swimmers of Spain
Spanish amputees
Spanish female backstroke swimmers
Spanish female breaststroke swimmers
Spanish female butterfly swimmers
Spanish female freestyle swimmers
Spanish female medley swimmers
Swimmers from Catalonia
Swimmers at the 2016 Summer Paralympics
Swimmers at the 2020 Summer Paralympics
Medalists at the 2016 Summer Paralympics
Medalists at the 2020 Summer Paralympics
Medalists at the World Para Swimming Championships
Medalists at the World Para Swimming European Championships
Swimmers at the 2018 Mediterranean Games
Paralympic medalists in swimming
Paralympic gold medalists for Spain
Paralympic silver medalists for Spain
People from Baix Llobregat
Sportspeople from the Province of Barcelona
Mediterranean Games competitors for Spain
S9-classified Paralympic swimmers
21st-century Spanish women